State Trading Corporation building (also known as Jawahar Vyapar Bhawan) in New Delhi, India, was designed by the architect Raj Rewal, and is home to the government-owned State Trading Corporation of India. Built between 1976 and 1989, it is considered to be an important example of modernist architecture in post-Independence India. Rewal used elements from the Japanese Metabolism style, but departed from it by drawing inspiration from Mughal architecture, as seen in the polychromatic sandstone cladding, instead of concrete. The "structurally expressive" design employs Vierendeel trusses. Apart from offices, the building houses the Central Cottage Industries Emporium, a government-run store that retails Indian crafts products.

References

Bibliography

Office buildings completed in 1989
1989 establishments in Delhi
Buildings and structures in New Delhi
Tourist attractions in Delhi
Office buildings in India
20th-century architecture in India